N. portoricensis may refer to:

 Nerax portoricensis, a robber fly
 Niso portoricensis, a sea snail
 Nola portoricensis, a tuft moth